{{Infobox legislature
| name               = Harrow London Borough Council
| native_name        =
| transcription_name =
| legislature        =
| coa_pic            = Coat of arms of the London Borough of Harrow.svg
| coa_res            = 150
| logo_pic           = Lb harrow logo.svg
| logo_res           = 200px
| house_type         = London borough council
| houses             =
| leader1_type       = Mayor of Harrow
| leader1            = Cllr Janet Mote
| party1             = Conservative
| election1          = May 2022
| leader2_type       = Leader of the Council
| leader2            = Cllr Paul Osborn
| party2             = Conservative 
| election2          = 24 May 2022
| leader3_type       = Chief executive
| leader3            = Patrick Flaherty
| party3             =
| election3          = September 2022
| members            = 55 councillors
| house1             =
| house2             =
| structure1         = Harrow London Borough Council 2022.svg
| structure1_res     = 250px
| political_groups1  = Administration (31)
 Conservative (31)Opposition (24) Labour (24)
| committees1        =
| committees2        =
| joint_committees   =
| voting_system1     = First past the post
| voting_system2     =
| last_election1     =  5 May 2022
| next_election1     = 7 May 2026
| session_room       = Harrow Civic Centre - geograph.org.uk - 76998.jpg
| session_res        = 250
| meeting_place      =Harrow Civic Centre
| website            = 
| footnotes          =
}}Harrow London Borough Council'''  is the local authority for the London Borough of Harrow in Greater London, England. It is a London borough council, one of 32 in the United Kingdom capital of London. It is currently controlled by the Conservative Party with 31 seats. The Labour Party is the sole opposition, with 24 seats.

History

There have previously been a number of local authorities responsible for the Harrow area. The current local authority was first elected in 1964, a year before formally coming into its powers and prior to the creation of the London Borough of Harrow on 1 April 1965. Harrow London Borough Council replaced Harrow Borough Council, which was formed when Harrow was incorporated in 1954. Harrow Urban District Council was the local authority from 1934 to 1954. Harrow Urban District Council replaced Harrow on the Hill Urban District Council, Wealdstone Urban District Council and Hendon Rural District Council, including Little Stanmore Parish Council, Great Stanmore Parish Council, Harrow Weald Parish Council and Pinner Parish Council, which were all created in 1894.

It was envisaged that through the London Government Act 1963 Harrow as a London local authority would share power with the Greater London Council. The split of powers and functions meant that the Greater London Council was responsible for "wide area" services such as fire, ambulance, flood prevention, and refuse disposal; with the local authorities responsible for "personal" services such as social care, libraries, cemeteries and refuse collection. As an outer London borough council it has been an education authority since 1965. This arrangement lasted until 1986 when Harrow London Borough Council gained responsibility for some services that had been provided by the Greater London Council, such as waste disposal. Since 2000 the Greater London Authority has taken some responsibility for highways and planning control from the council, but within the English local government system the council remains a "most purpose" authority in terms of the available range of powers and functions.

Powers and functions
The local authority derives its powers and functions from the London Government Act 1963 and subsequent legislation, and has the powers and functions of a London borough council. It sets council tax and as a billing authority also collects precepts for Greater London Authority functions and business rates. It sets planning policies which complement Greater London Authority and national policies, and decides on almost all planning applications accordingly.  It is a local education authority  and is also responsible for council housing, social services, libraries, waste collection and disposal, traffic, and most roads and environmental health.

Councillors 
As of 5 May 2022, the composition of Harrow Council is 31 Conservative councillors to 24 Labour councillors:

Summary results of elections

References

External links 
London Borough of Harrow website

Local authorities in London
London borough councils
Politics of the London Borough of Harrow
Leader and cabinet executives
Local education authorities in England
Billing authorities in England